Russell Train's marble gecko (Gekko russelltraini) is a species of lizard in the family Gekkonidae. The species is endemic to southeastern Vietnam.

Etymology
The specific name, russelltraini, is in honor of American lawyer Russell Errol Train, who was Chairman and Chairman Emeritus of the World Wildlife Fund in the USA.

Habitat

Description
G. russelltraini is moderate-sized for its genus.

References

Further reading
Ngo VT, Bauer AM, Wood PL Jr, Grismer JL (2009). "A new species of Gekko Laurenti, 1768 (Squamata: Gekkonidae) from Dong Nai Province, Southeastern Vietnam". Zootaxa 2238: 33–42. (Gekko russelltraini, new species).

Gekko
Reptiles described in 2009
Reptiles of Vietnam
Endemic fauna of Vietnam